Gholam Veys (also Romanized as Gholām Veys and Gholam veis; also known as Ghulām Raīs) is a village in Bizineh Rud Rural District, Bizineh Rud District, Khodabandeh County, Zanjan Province, Iran. At the 2006 census, its population was 1,735, in 343 families.

References 

Populated places in Khodabandeh County